Audressein is a commune in the Ariège department in the Occitanie region of south-western France.

The inhabitants of the commune are known as Audressenois or Audressenoises.

Geography
Audressein is situated on the former Route nationale 618, the "Route of the Pyrenees", at the start of the climb to the Col de la Core some 18 km south-west of Saint-Girons. Access to the commune is by the D618 road from Argein in the west which passes through the centre of the commune and the village and continues to Engomer in the north-east. The D804 goes from Sor in the west through the commune just south of the village and continues to Castillon-en-Couserans in the south-east. The commune is mixed forest and farmland with substantial forests in the north.

The Léz river flows through the commune from south to north forming the south-eastern border of the commune and continues north-east to join the Salat at Saint-Girons. The Bouigane river flows from the west across the commune to join the Lez at the village. The Long Rieu stream rises in the north of the commune and flows south to join the Bouigane near the village.

Neighbouring communes and villages

Administration

List of Successive Mayors

Demography
In 2017 the commune had 139 inhabitants.

Culture and heritage

Civil heritage
The commune has two sites that are registered as historical monuments:

The Hydraulic Thresher Building (19th century)
An Ornamental Garden

Religious heritage

The commune has one religious building that is registered as an historical monument:
The Church of Notre-Dame-de-Tramesaygues (14th century). The church is listed as a World Heritage Site on the Routes of Santiago de Compostela. The original porch had three entries and a Bell tower from the 14th century. The church contains several items that are registered as historical objects:
A Wayside Cross (15th century)
A Baptismal Font (17th century)
A Cabinet for Baptismal Fonts (17th century)
A Bronze Bell (1558)
A Group Sculpture: Virgin of Pity (15th century)
An ex-voto Monumental Painting (15th century)
Ex-voto Monumental Paintings (16th century)

Other religious sites
The Church of Saint-Martin
The Presbytery contains one item that is registered as an historical object:
A Cross (14th century)

See also
Communes of the Ariège department

References

External links
Audressein on the old IGN website 
Audressein on Géoportail, National Geographic Institute (IGN) website 
Audreßein on the 1750 Cassini Map

Communes of Ariège (department)
World Heritage Sites in France